The WTA Auckland Open (currently sponsored by ASB Bank and called the ASB Classic) is a professional women's tennis tournament in Auckland, New Zealand. The tournament is played annually, in the first week of January, at the ASB Tennis Centre in the suburb of Parnell, just east of the Central Business District. It is an International level tournament in the Women's Tennis Association (WTA) World Tour. The equivalent men's event, the ATP Auckland Open, is played in the following week, immediately ahead of the first Grand Slam tournament of the season, the Australian Open.

The Auckland Open returned in 2023 after the 2021 and 2022 events were cancelled due to the COVID-19 pandemic owing travel restrictions for international visitors to New Zealand.

Past results

Singles

Doubles

Original Auckland Open

1974–1982 singles

See also
 List of tennis tournaments
 ATP Auckland Open – men's tournament

References

External links
Official website

 
Tennis tournaments in New Zealand
Sports competitions in Auckland
Hard court tennis tournaments
WTA Tour
Recurring sporting events established in 1986
Summer events in New Zealand